Yuki Kaneko may refer to:

Yuki Kaneko (footballer, born 1982), Japanese footballer
Yuki Kaneko (footballer, born 1996), Japanese footballer
Yuki Kaneko (badminton) (born 1994), Japanese badminton player
Yūki Kaneko (born 1987), Japanese voice actress